El Pulgar is a precipitous granite monolith  high standing  north of Berg Peak in the northern Morozumi Range, Victoria Land, Antarctica. The feature was climbed by four members of the New Zealand Geological Survey Antarctic Expedition, 1967–68, who gave the name, "el pulgar" being Spanish for "the thumb". This monolith lies situated on the Pennell Coast, a portion of Antarctica lying between Cape Williams and Cape Adare.

References 

Rock formations of Victoria Land
Pennell Coast